Tomasovia Tomaszów Lubelski is a Polish football club based in Tomaszów Lubelski. Following relegation from III liga, group IV, they will compete in the IV liga in the 2022–23 season, the fifth tier of the Polish football league.

History
Tomasovia Tomaszów Lubelski was formed in 1923 as Thomosovia. Shortly before World War II the club changed its name to Tomasovia. In the 1975–76 season, the club gained promotion to the reformed third tier of the Polish football league for the first time in its history. They went on to spend seven seasons at this level, achieving a club record highest league finish of tenth place in the 1997–98 season. Despite finishing in 10th place, Tomasovia were relegated to the fourth tier due to league restructuring.

Stadium
The club play their home matches at Stadion Miejski w Tomaszowie Lubelskim, which has a capacity of 2,050.

References

External links
Official website
90minut.pl profile

Football clubs in Poland
Association football clubs established in 1923
Football clubs in Lublin Voivodeship
1923 establishments in Poland